Aymeric Jean Louis Gérard Alphonse Laporte (born 27 May 1994) is a professional footballer who plays as a centre-back for  club Manchester City and the Spain national team. He previously played for Basconia and Athletic Bilbao.

When he joined Athletic Bilbao in 2010 at the age of 16, he became only the second player born in France—after Bixente Lizarazu—to play for them, going on to make 222 competitive appearances for the club. In January 2018, he signed for Manchester City. He was part of the side which won the first domestic treble in English men's football in 2019.

Born in France, Laporte won 51 caps for the country at youth international levels, and was called up to the senior team twice but remained uncapped. In 2021, after receiving Spanish citizenship and approval from FIFA to switch national teams, Laporte was named in Spain's squad for UEFA Euro 2020. He would then go on to represent the nation at the 2022 FIFA World Cup.

Early life
Laporte was born in Agen, Aquitaine, France; and he is of Basque descent through his great-grandparents. He started playing football and rugby at the age of five, and began his development at Agen's football academy. In 2009, he was invited to join Athletic Bilbao after being scouted; by arrangement with the club, he spent a season with Bayonne as he was too young to move outside France at the time.

Club career

Athletic Bilbao
Laporte arrived in Bilbao formally in 2010, joining Athletic's youth setup at Lezama, prompting debate locally over whether his signing met the criteria of their policy due to his tenuous links to the Basque region. He went on to play for the club's youth and reserve teams. On 28 November 2012 he was given his debut with the main squad by manager Marcelo Bielsa, playing the full 90 minutes in a 2–0 away win against Hapoel Ironi Kiryat Shmona in that season's UEFA Europa League.

Laporte made his first La Liga appearance on 9 December 2012, appearing one minute in a 1–0 home win over Celta Vigo. He was inserted in the starting line-up the following week, helping the Lions to defeat Mallorca by the same scoreline, and was definitely promoted to the first team shortly after, signing a new contract until 2015; on 14 January 2013, he was given the number 4 jersey previously worn by Ustaritz, and late in the month he renewed his contract, running until 2016 and with a €27.5 million release clause.

Laporte became an regular starter under new coach Ernesto Valverde, also being deployed as left-back on occasion. He scored his first goal as a professional on 28 October 2013, netting the game's only at Getafe. At the end of 2013–14 league season, he was voted into the La Liga Team of the Year by the reporters of the Liga de Fútbol Profesional.

In June 2015, Laporte extended his link until 2019 with a release clause of €50 million. After losing the 2015 Copa del Rey Final to Barcelona, he played both legs of the 2015 Supercopa de España triumph against the same opposition, Bilbao's first silverware for 31 years.

On 13 June 2016, Laporte renewed his contract until 2020, with his buyout clause rising to an initial €65 million.

Manchester City
Near the end of the winter transfer window of January 2018, Laporte signed for Manchester City for a reported fee of £57 million (his contractual release clause amount and a record-breaking figure for both clubs). He was given the number 14 shirt, while Bilbao immediately spent around half of the fee on Iñigo Martínez as a replacement.

Just one day after signing, Laporte made his Manchester City and Premier League debut against West Bromwich Albion. City came out victorious winning 3–0 as they kept up their title charge. He went on to make 13 appearances throughout the season for City, helping them accumulate an unprecedented 100 points in a Premier League season. He made a total of nine league appearances meaning he was eligible for a winner's medal.

Laporte scored his first goal for City on 25 August 2018, equalising against Wolverhampton Wanderers in a 1–1 away draw. He made 51 appearances during the 2018–19 season as the club completed the first domestic treble in English football history (Premier League, FA Cup, League Cup, plus the Community Shield). He scored five goals throughout the season, including an important goal on the final day of the Premier League campaign as City romped to victory over Brighton and Hove Albion securing back-to-back league titles and the second of Laporte's career. Overall he played a total of 4,352 minutes.

On 31 August 2019, Laporte sustained an injury to his right knee, causing him to be carried off on a stretcher. He underwent surgery in September 2019.

Laporte had been an automatic starter for Manchester City after his return from injury during the 2019–20 season and through the start of the 2020–21 season until a poor display in a 2–0 defeat to Tottenham Hotspur on 21 November 2020. John Stones replaced Laporte in the centre of defence and formed a formidable partnership with new signing Rúben Dias in Laporte's absence from the starting lineup. On 25 April 2021, Laporte headed in the only goal of the game as City beat Tottenham to win their fourth straight EFL Cup.

International career

France
Laporte represented France at under-17, under-18, under-19 and under-21 levels, captaining each side. He was part of the team that came runners-up to Serbia in the 2013 UEFA European Under-19 Championship in Lithuania, and was selected in the Team of the Tournament.

On 24 March 2016, in a 2017 European Under-21 Championship qualifier against Scotland in Angers, Laporte was stretchered off with a fracture and dislocation to his right fibula and ankle, concluding his season prematurely. Previously, in October 2015, he stated that he would consider representing Spain if rejected by France for UEFA Euro 2016.

In August 2016, at the behest of new national manager Julen Lopetegui, Laporte began the process of making himself eligible for Spain. A month later, he was called up to the senior France squad by Didier Deschamps for 2018 World Cup qualifiers against Bulgaria and the Netherlands in October, and stated he had decided not to apply for Spanish nationality with the continued aim of playing for France. He did not take part in either match.

In August 2019, he was called up for France's UEFA Euro 2020 qualifying fixtures against Albania and Andorra; however just two days later he was injured playing for his club and ruled out of any involvement.

Spain
In May 2021, the Spanish Council of Ministers granted Spanish nationality to Laporte following a process initiated on his behalf by the Royal Spanish Football Federation (RFEF); FIFA approved the change of nationality later that week, allowing him to play for Spain at the upcoming UEFA Euro 2020 tournament. Laporte had previously claimed that "playing for Spain is out of the question" and that he would not apply for dual citizenship.

On 24 May 2021, Laporte was included in Spain's 24-man squad for Euro 2020. On 4 June, he made his Spain debut when he started in a friendly goalless draw with Portugal. He scored his debut goal for the national team on 23 June, in the group stage 5–0 routing of Slovakia.

Style of play
Spanish football journalist Guillem Balagué described Laporte as a "centre-back who can play from the back and is strong", adding that "he is certainly a powerful defender". He is also known for his passing ability.

Personal life
His younger brother Léo Laporte is also a footballer who plays for Deportivo Alavés.

Career statistics

Club

International

Scores and results list Spain's goal tally first, score column indicates score after each Laporte goal

Honours
Athletic Bilbao
Supercopa de España: 2015
Copa del Rey runner-up: 2014–15

Manchester City
Premier League: 2017–18, 2018–19, 2020–21, 2021–22
FA Cup: 2018–19
EFL Cup: 2017–18, 2018–19, 2020–21
FA Community Shield: 2018
UEFA Champions League runner-up: 2020–21

France U19
UEFA European Under-19 Championship runner-up: 2013

Spain
UEFA Nations League runner-up: 2020–21

Individual
UEFA European Under-19 Championship Team of the Tournament: 2013
La Liga Team of the Year: 2013–14
PFA Team of the Year: 2018–19 Premier League

See also
List of Spain international footballers born outside Spain
List of sportspeople who competed for more than one nation

References

External links

Profile at the Manchester City F.C. website

1994 births
Living people
Sportspeople from Agen
Footballers from Nouvelle-Aquitaine
French footballers
Spanish footballers
Association football defenders
Aviron Bayonnais FC players
CD Basconia footballers
Bilbao Athletic footballers
Athletic Bilbao footballers
Manchester City F.C. players
Tercera División players
Segunda División B players
La Liga players
Premier League players
FA Cup Final players
France youth international footballers
France under-21 international footballers
Spain international footballers
UEFA Euro 2020 players
2022 FIFA World Cup players
French expatriate footballers
Spanish expatriate footballers
Expatriate footballers in England
Expatriate footballers in Spain
French expatriate sportspeople in England
French expatriate sportspeople in Spain
Spanish expatriate sportspeople in England
French people of Basque descent
Spanish people of Basque descent
Spanish people of French descent
Naturalised citizens of Spain
French emigrants to Spain
Naturalised association football players